In Switzerland, the appellation d'origine protégée (AOP, 'protected designation of origin') is a geographical indication (see also Appellation) protecting the origin and the quality of traditional food products other than wines (wines have another label called appellation d'origine contrôlée, AOC, 'controlled designation of origin').

In the past, the appellation d'origine contrôlée certification was used for both wines and other food products. In 2013, to match the system of the European Union, the appellation d'origine contrôlée was replaced by the appellation d'origine protégée for agricultural products other than wine.

Geographical indications and traditional specialities in Switzerland 
The appellation d'origine protégée (AOP, protected designation of origin) certifies that "everything, from the raw material to the processing and the final product, comes from one clearly defined region of origin".

The indication géographique protégée (IGP, protected geographical indication) certifies that products were "either manufactured, processed or prepared at their place of origin".

The appellation d'origine contrôlé (AOC, controlled designation of origin) certifies wines.

Products

Appellation d'origine protégée (AOP) 
 Abricotine / Eau-de-vie d’abricot du Valais
 Berner Alpkäse / Berner Hobelkäse
 Boutefas
 Cardon épineux genevois
 Cuchaule
 Damassine
 Eau-de-vie de poire du Valais
 Huile de noix vaudoise
 Jambon de la Borne
 Munder Safran
 Pain de seigle valaisan
 Poire à Botzi
 Rheintaler Ribel
 Zuger / Rigi Kirsch

Cheeses
 Berner Alpkäse/Berner Hobelkäse
 Emmentaler
 L'Etivaz
 Formaggio d'alpe ticinese
 Glarner Alpkäse
 Gruyère
 Raclette du Valais / Walliser Raclette
 Sbrinz
 Tête de Moine, Fromage de Bellelay
 Vacherin Fribourgeois
 Vacherin Mont d'Or
 Werdenberger Sauerkäse, Liechtensteiner Sauerkäse und Bloderkäse

AOP candidates 
 Jambon de la borne
 Grappa Ticino

Indication géographique protégée (IGP) 
 Appenzeller Mostbröckli
 Appenzeller Siedwurst
 Appenzeller Pantli
 Berner Zungenwurst
 Bündnerfleisch
 Glarner Kalberwurst
 Longeole
 Saucisse d'Ajoie
 Saucisson neuchâtelois et Saucisse neuchâteloise
 Saucisson vaudois
 Saucisse aux choux vaudoise
 St. Galler Bratwurst
 Walliser Rohschinken
 Walliser Trockenfleisch
 Walliser Trockenspeck
 Zuger Kirschtorte

IGP candidates 
 Absinthe de Val-de-Travers

See also 
 Geographical indications and traditional specialities in the European Union
 Agriculture in Switzerland
 Culinary Heritage of Switzerland

Notes and references

Bibliography 
  Stéphane Boisseaux and Dominique Barjolle, La bataille des AOC en Suisse. Les appellations d'origine contrôlées et les nouveaux terroirs, collection « Le savoir suisse », Presses polytechniques et universitaires romandes, 2004.

Certification marks
Agriculture in Switzerland
Appellations